Given positive integers  and , the -th Macaulay representation of  is an expression for  as a sum of binomial coefficients:

Here,  is a uniquely determined, strictly increasing sequence of nonnegative integers known as the Macaulay coefficients.

Macaulay coefficients are also known as the combinatorial number system.

References 
 
 
 

Factorial and binomial topics